Order of the Holy Cross refers to several institutions by that name:

Order of the Holy Cross (OHC) an Anglican Benedictine community founded in 1884, based in New York state
Crosiers, a group of similar Catholic orders, including:
Canons Regular of the Holy Cross (ORC), a Catholic religious order founded in Portugal in 1131 and refounded in 1977
Canons Regular of the Order of the Holy Cross (OSC), alias the Crosiers, a Catholic religious order founded in 1211 at Clairlieu near Huy, Belgium
Patriarchal Order of the Holy Cross of Jerusalem, an ecclesiastical order conferred by the Melkite Catholic Church

See also
Holy Cross (disambiguation)